Robert Matterson Vaughn (1833 – 14 April 1908) was an Australian politician, member of the New South Wales Legislative Assembly.

Vaughn was born in Ohio, United States of America, son of Jesse Vaughn, a farmer, and his wife Betsy,  Matterson. Vaughn was educated at the Baptist Geauga Seminary in Chester, Ohio. In 1852 Vaughn travelled to the Californian goldfields. In 1853 Vaughn arrived in Sydney and became a professional goldminer on the major diggings in New South Wales and Victoria.

Vaughn represented Grenfell in the Legislative Assembly of New South Wales from November 1880, and was Secretary for Mines in the fifth Robertson Ministry, from December 1885 to February 1886. He was defeated by George Greene at the general election in 1889. At the general election in 1891 he was again returned for Grenfell as a  candidate. He stood as a  candidate at the 1894 election, but finished third, with Greene regaining the seat.

Vaughn died in Paddington, New South Wales on 14 April 1908; he was survived by his wife, five daughters and three sons.

References

 

1833 births
1908 deaths
Members of the New South Wales Legislative Assembly
People from Meigs County, Ohio
19th-century Australian politicians